Birger Hall Mauritzen (born 5 August 1949) is a Danish former footballer who played as a midfielder. He made four appearances for the Denmark national team from 1975 to 1976.

References

External links
 
 

1949 births
Living people
Danish men's footballers
Association football midfielders
Denmark international footballers
Vanløse IF players